Johannes Meyer  (13 August 1888 – 25 January 1976) was a German screenwriter and film director. He directed a number of films during the Weimar, Nazi and post-War eras, most notably Fridericus (1936), one in a series of epics about Frederick the Great.

Selected filmography
 Horrido (1924)
 The Poacher (1926)
 Guilty (1928)
 High Treason (1929)
 The Blonde Nightingale (1930)
 The Rhineland Girl (1930)
 The Tiger Murder Case (1930)
 Ash Wednesday (1931)
 Alarm at Midnight (1931)
 I'll Stay with You (1931)
 Two Heavenly Blue Eyes (1932)
 Under False Flag (1932)
 Happy Days in Aranjuez (1933)
 Die kleine Schwindlerin (1933)
 There Is Only One Love (1933)
 Black Fighter Johanna (1934)
 The Fugitive from Chicago (1934)
 The Legacy of Pretoria (1934)
 Fridericus (1937)
 Beate's Mystery (1938)
 Der singende Tor (1939)
 Marriage in Small Doses (1939)
 Wild Bird (1943)
 Rätsel der Nacht (1945)
 Blocked Signals (1948)
 I'll Never Forget That Night (1949)
 Furioso (1950)

References

Bibliography
 Richards, Jeffrey. Visions of Yesterday. Routledge & Kegan Paul, 1973.
 Taylor, Richard. Film propaganda: Soviet Russia and Nazi Germany. I.B. Tauris, 1998.

External links
 

1888 births
1976 deaths
German film directors
People from Brzeg